Gorni Tsibar is a village in Valchedram Municipality, Montana Province, northwestern Bulgaria.

References

Villages in Montana Province